Oybek Bozorov (Uzbek Cyrillic: Ойбек Бозоров; born 7 August 1997) is an Uzbekistani footballer who plays as a forward for Nasaf.

Career

International
He made his debut for main team, Uzbekistan on 23 February 2020 in a friendly match against Belarus.

''Statistics accurate as of match played 23 February 2020.

References

1997 births
Living people
Uzbekistani footballers
Uzbekistan youth international footballers
Association football midfielders
FC Nasaf players
Uzbekistan Super League players